Mount Tohivea (or Tohiea) is an extinct volcano on the island of Mo'orea in French Polynesia.

Toheia is a remnant of the shield-building volcanic phase which built the island of Mo'orea. Its age has been estimated at between 1.9 and 1.5 Mya.

Hiking trails on the mountain offer views of  Cook's Bay, Opunohu Bay, and Tahiti.

The mountain appears of the French Polynesian 50 and 100 franc coins.

References

Tohivea
Mo'orea